Miloš Stanković (born 22 July 1992) is a Serbian footballer. He can play on many positions in attack, and also as an attacking midfielder or winger. His twin brother Dušan is also footballer, and performs as a right-back.

Career
Miloš started career in Vlasina, but later he moved in OFK Beograd, together with his twin brother Dušan. They were members of the team from Karaburma from 2011 to 2014, but without official caps for the first team. In the meantime, twins were loaned to Bačka Topola, Timok, and Sloga Petrovac. They also moved together in Moravac Mrštane for the 2014–15 season, but Dušan left the club after first half of season. Although Moravac was relegated from the Serbian First League, Stanković was one of the best in team, and he joined Serbian SuperLiga club Radnik Surdulica in summer 2015.

Career statistics

References

External links
 
 Miloš Stanković stats at utakmica.rs 
 

1992 births
Living people
Sportspeople from Leskovac
Association football forwards
Serbian footballers
FK Vlasina players
FK TSC Bačka Topola players
FK Timok players
FK Sloga Petrovac na Mlavi players
FK Moravac Mrštane players
FK Radnik Surdulica players
FK Voždovac players
Serbian First League players
Serbian SuperLiga players